Jonathan Bryan Toews  (born April 29, 1988) is a Canadian professional ice hockey centre and captain of the Chicago Blackhawks of the National Hockey League (NHL). Nicknamed "Captain Serious", Toews was selected by the Blackhawks with the third overall pick in the 2006 NHL Entry Draft. He joined the team in 2007–08 and was nominated for the Calder Memorial Trophy as NHL Rookie of the Year. The following season he was named team captain, becoming the second-youngest captain in NHL history (after Sidney Crosby) at the time. Toews won the Stanley Cup in 2010, along with the Conn Smythe Trophy for the most valuable player in the playoffs. After winning the Cup, Toews passed Peter Forsberg as the youngest player to join the Triple Gold Club. He won the Stanley Cup again in 2013 and 2015.

Toews competes internationally for Team Canada and has won gold medals at the 2005 World U-17 Hockey Challenge, 2006 and 2007 World Junior Championships, 2007 World Championships, the 2010 Winter Olympics (a tournament in which he was named best forward) and the 2014 Winter Olympics. In 2017, he was named one of the 100 Greatest NHL Players.

Playing career

Amateur 
Toews was selected first overall in the 2003 WHL Bantam Draft by the Tri-City Americans, but chose instead to play midget AAA hockey at Shattuck-Saint Mary's, a boarding school in Faribault, Minnesota, during the 2003–04 and 2004–05 seasons. The decision enabled him to retain his NCAA eligibility. Toews scored 110 points in 64 games in his second season with Shattuck-Saint Mary's before moving on to play college ice hockey.

Toews played two seasons at the University of North Dakota, compiling 85 points (40 goals and 45 assists), a +38 plus-minus rating and a 56.7% faceoff winning percentage in 76 games. He helped UND reach the NCAA Frozen Four in both 2006 and 2007, serving as an alternate captain in his sophomore season. Toews registered 39 points as a freshman and earned Rookie of the Week honours twice. He helped North Dakota capture the Broadmoor Trophy as Western Collegiate Hockey Association (WCHA) conference champions and also was named West Regional MVP after tallying five points.

Going into the 2006 NHL Entry Draft, Toews was ranked third among North American prospects by the NHL Central Scouting Bureau, and was ultimately chosen third overall by the Chicago Blackhawks.

Professional

Chicago Blackhawks

In 2007–08, he opted out of his final two years of college hockey eligibility to debut with the Blackhawks after signing a three-year, entry-level contract on May 16, 2007. He scored his first career NHL goal on his first shot in his first game on October 10, 2007, against the San Jose Sharks. He then recorded the second-longest point-scoring streak to start an NHL career, registering a point in each of his first ten games (five goals and five assists). On January 1, 2008, Toews sprained his knee in a game against the Los Angeles Kings. Despite missing 16 games from the injury, Toews led all rookies in goal-scoring and finished third in points. Toews finished second in team scoring behind fellow rookie Patrick Kane. Toews and Kane battled all season for the lead in team and rookie scoring before Toews went down to injury. The two were both nominated for the Calder Memorial Trophy as NHL rookie of the year along with Washington Capitals forward Nicklas Bäckström; Toews finished as a runner-up to winner Kane.

Following his successful rookie campaign, Toews was named team captain of the Blackhawks on July 18, 2008. At 20 years and 79 days, he became the third-youngest team captain in NHL history, behind Sidney Crosby and Vincent Lecavalier. This feat was later surpassed by Gabriel Landeskog and Connor McDavid. Toews had previously been named an alternate captain in December 2007, during the 2007–08 season. In the subsequent season, he was voted as a starter, along with teammates Patrick Kane and Brian Campbell, for the 2009 NHL All-Star Game in Montreal, Quebec. He netted his first career hat-trick in the NHL on February 27, 2009, in a 5–4 overtime loss to Pittsburgh. Toews finished the 2008–09 season with 69 points in 82 games, helping the Blackhawks to their first Stanley Cup playoff appearance since 2002. He then added 13 points in 17 playoff games as the Blackhawks advanced to the Western Conference Finals, where they were eliminated by the Detroit Red Wings in five games.

Less than a month into the 2009–10 season, Toews was sidelined with concussion-like symptoms after receiving an open-ice hit from defenceman Willie Mitchell in a 3–2 loss to the Vancouver Canucks on October 21, 2009. Toews had his head down while receiving a pass in the neutral zone when Mitchell left the penalty box and checked him with his shoulder. Toews was sidelined for several games before returning to the line-up.

In the final year of his contract, Toews, as well as teammates Duncan Keith and Patrick Kane, agreed to extensions in early December 2009. His deal was structured similarly to Kane's, worth about $6.5 million annually for five seasons. Toews finished the season with 68 points in 76 games.

During the 2010 playoffs, Toews recorded his second career hat-trick, along with two assists, leading the Blackhawks in a 7–4 playoff victory against Vancouver on May 7, 2010. On June 9, 2010, Toews led Chicago to the franchise's first Stanley Cup championship since 1961, defeating the Philadelphia Flyers in Game 6 of the Finals. He became the second-youngest captain in the history of the NHL to win the Cup, behind Sidney Crosby, who led the Pittsburgh Penguins to the championship the previous season. Toews scored seven goals and 29 points in the playoffs, and won the Conn Smythe Trophy as playoff MVP. By winning the Stanley Cup, he also became the youngest player, at 22 years of age, to become a member of the Triple Gold Club (Olympic gold, the Stanley Cup and World Championship).

In the off-season, Toews was selected to be the cover player for EA Sports' video game NHL 11 on June 21, 2010. It marked the first time in EA Sports history that two players of the same team were featured on a video game cover two years in a row, as teammate Patrick Kane had been on the cover of NHL 10.

During the 2010–11 season, Toews recorded a career-high 76 points in 80 games. Due to salary cap constraints, the Blackhawks were forced to trade away many of their players from the previous season's championship-winning team, including Antti Niemi, Dustin Byfuglien, Kris Versteeg and Andrew Ladd. As a result, the Blackhawks narrowly made the 2011 playoffs, ending the regular season as the eighth and final seed in the Western Conference. Down three games to none in the opening round against the Vancouver Canucks, the Blackhawks won three straight games to force a deciding Game 7. In the contest, Toews scored a short-handed game-tying goal with 1:26 remaining in regulation. The Canucks, however, went on to score five minutes into the ensuing overtime period to eliminate the Blackhawks. Toews had four points in the seven-game series.

Toews was to play in the 2012 All-Star Game, but an injury sustained during a 5–2 loss to the Nashville Predators kept him from playing; he was replaced by Scott Hartnell. Toews finished the 2011–12 season with 57 points in an injury-shortened year. He returned to play at the start of the 2012 playoffs, where he scored the overtime winner in Game 5 to send the series back to Chicago for Game 6, where the opposition Phoenix Coyotes won 4–0 to eliminate the Blackhawks from the playoffs.

In the lockout-shortened season of 2013, Toews returned to top form. He helped the Blackhawks win the Presidents' Trophy as the team with the best regular-season record. In the 2013 playoffs, Toews led the Blackhawks to a Finals over the Boston Bruins, Chicago's second title in three seasons. At the end of the year, he was also awarded the Frank J. Selke Trophy as the League's top defensive forward and was named to the NHL second All-Star team.

Toews scored the second natural hat-trick of his NHL career on October 29, 2013, against Craig Anderson of the Ottawa Senators. The 2013–14 season finished as another productive campaign for Toews. In 76 games, he scored 28 goals and 40 assists for 68 points. The Blackhawks' 2014 playoff run lasted to overtime of Game 7 of the Western Conference Final, and Toews put up 17 points (nine goals and eight assists) in 19 games. For the second year in a row, he finished as a finalist for the Selke Trophy, though he came third in voting behind the winner Patrice Bergeron and first runner-up Anže Kopitar.

On July 9, 2014, the Blackhawks announced that Toews, along with teammate Patrick Kane, had signed an eight-year extension with the Blackhawks at an average annual salary of $10.5 million. The contract will come into effect on July 1, 2015, for the 2015–16 season.

During Game 7 of the 2015 Western Conference Final, Toews scored the game's first two goals en route to a 5–3 victory over the Anaheim Ducks. In the Finals, Toews led the Blackhawks to their third Stanley Cup championship in six seasons after the team's Game 6 victory over the Tampa Bay Lightning, 2–0. On June 24, Toews was named the recipient of the Mark Messier Leadership Award, awarded to the individual "in recognition of his commitment and service to charities in his community," as well as exemplifying a superior leadership ability in hockey, beating-out fellow finalists Ryan Getzlaf and Andrew Ladd. Toews also won an ESPY Award for 'Best NHL Player' in 2015. Electronic Arts selected Toews to appear on the cover of NHL 16.

Toews was selected to play in the 2016 All-Star Game, but missed the game on account of illness. He was suspended for one game per NHL rules for not attending the All-Star game.

During the 2016–17 Chicago Blackhawks season, Toews suffered a back injury that forced him to miss nine games. He was voted into the 2017 National Hockey League All-Star Game.

Toews' productivity declined during the 2017–18 season, where he posted a career-low 52 points. He revealed he adopted a new training regimen and nutrition plan to help him better prepare for the upcoming season. A rejuvenated Toews tallied a career-high 81 points while appearing in all 82 games for Chicago during the 2018–19 season.

Toews appeared in 70 games during the 2019–20 Chicago Blackhawks season, which was shortened due to the COVID-19 pandemic. He recorded 18 goals and 42 assists during the campaign while eclipsing the 800-career point milestone. Toews also totaled a team-high nine points in nine games during the 2020 Stanley Cup playoffs.

Before the start of the 2020–21 season, the Blackhawks announced Toews would be out indefinitely while recovering from an undisclosed illness. He missed the entire season before announcing in June 2021 that he was diagnosed with chronic immune response syndrome and that he planned to return for the 2021–22 season. In September 2021, he said an antibody test revealed he had COVID-19 at some point. Toews played the 1000th regular season game of his career on March 31, 2022. Toews appeared in 71 games for the Blackhawks, where he recorded 12 goals and 25 assists for a career-low 37 points. He also maintained a 57% faceoff win-rate, which was the third best in the NHL among all centers with at least 1000 faceoff draws.

Toews bounced back during the first half of the 2022–23 season with 14 goals and assists for 28 points in 46 appearances. However, Toews' health deteriorated midway through the season causing him to miss several weeks. He announced on February 19, 2023 that he was still suffering from symptoms of long COVID and Chronic Immune Response Syndrome. He offered no timetable for his return, commenting, "it has reached the point where I had no choice but to step back and concentrate on getting healthy."

International play

In 2005, Toews captained Canada West at the World U-17 Hockey Challenge to a gold medal. He scored the game-winning goal in a 3–1 win over Canada Pacific in the championship game. He finished with 12 points, ranked first in tournament scoring, and was named tournament MVP.

In his draft year, Toews competed on Canada's junior team at the 2006 World Junior Championships as the youngest player on the team. He tallied two assists during the tournament, both against Norway in preliminary play, as Canada ultimately defeated Russia in the gold medal game, 5–0.

In 2007, Toews earned a second-straight World Junior gold medal. In the tournament semi-final against the United States, Toews scored three times in the shootout to advance to the final. With seven points, Toews led Canada in scoring and was named to the Tournament All-Star team alongside teammate Carey Price. Shortly after his gold medal win, Toews was honoured by his hometown American Hockey League (AHL) team, the Manitoba Moose, on February 3, 2007, as he was presented with an honorary jersey for his tournament efforts.

That same year, Toews also made his senior international debut at the 2007 World Championships and recorded seven points in nine games competing against mostly professional players after just his second year of college hockey (at the time of selection, Toews had not yet turned professional). Canada earned gold over Finland 4–2 in the championship game. After the victory, Toews became the first Canadian to win a World Junior championship and a World Championship in the same year. On June 29, 2007, Toews was awarded the Order of the Buffalo Hunt, an award given by the Province of Manitoba in honour of sporting achievements, for his play in the junior and senior world championships.

After Toews' rookie year in the NHL, he competed in his second World Championships in 2008.

On December 30, 2009, Toews was selected to play for Canada at the 2010 Winter Olympics in Vancouver, British Columbia. He was named to the squad along with Blackhawks teammates Brent Seabrook and Duncan Keith.  He ended the tournament with a team-leading eight points, while his seven assists tied with Pavol Demitra of Slovakia for the tournament lead. Toews' lone goal of the tournament opened the scoring in Canada's 3–2 overtime win in the gold medal game against the United States. As a result, he was awarded Best Forward and tournament all-star team honours. At the 2014 Winter Olympics in Sochi, he scored the first goal in the gold medal game against Sweden on the way to Canada's second-straight Olympic gold medal.

Personal life 
Jonathan was born to Bryan Toews, an electrician at the University of Manitoba, and Andrée Gilbert, a native of Sainte-Marie, Quebec, who was the managing director and finance expert for a credit union in the Winnipeg region before retiring to oversee Toews' media relations. He is bilingual, speaking fluent French and English.

Like Toews, his brother David also attended Shattuck-Saint Mary's and began his freshman year at the University of North Dakota in 2008–09. His cousin Kai Toews is a professional basketball player.

In January 2007, Toews and former North Dakota teammate T. J. Oshie received alcohol-related citations for being minors in a Grand Forks, North Dakota, tavern. Toews and Oshie pleaded guilty to the charges. The two were later placed on probation and ordered to perform community service.

In the spring of 2010, a large mural of Toews visible from the Eisenhower Expressway in Chicago received a degree of notoriety. The mural depicted Toews with an abnormally shaped nose and mouth, posed beside a picture of the Stanley Cup (appropriately, Toews would end up holding the Cup after winning it later that year). Toews commented on the mural, stating: "I guess it's from a picture and they must have embellished it a little bit. They're not helping me by any means."

Following the celebration of Toews bringing the Stanley Cup to his hometown of Winnipeg, the Province of Manitoba announced that it would be naming a northern lake after Toews in honour of his success. The same day, the Dakota Community Centre in St. Vital where Toews first played organized hockey was renamed the Jonathan Toews Community Centre. Additionally, he was given the Keys to the City to honour his achievement and strong work ethic.

Career statistics

Regular season and playoffs
Bold indicates led league

International

Awards, honours and championships

 World U-17 Hockey Challenge MVP — 2005 World U-17 Hockey Challenge — 2005
 WCHA Rookie of the Week — twice in 2005–2006
 NCAA West Regional MVP — 2006
 World Junior All-Star team — 2007
 Nominated for the Calder Memorial Trophy — 2008
 6× NHL All-Star (2009, 2011, 2012,* 2015, 2016*, 2017)* – Did not attend due to injury/illness.
 All-Star selection of the 2010 Olympic Hockey Tournament
 2010 Winter Olympics — Gold Medalist, Best Forward
 2010 Conn Smythe Trophy winner
 Second-youngest to win the Conn Smythe Trophy (22 years, 41 days; only Patrick Roy was younger); youngest captain to win the Conn Smythe Trophy.
 Youngest person to gain entry into the Triple Gold Club (22 years, 41 days at time last component was achieved)
 Named full captain of an NHL team after only 64 NHL games; fifth-youngest full captain (Connor McDavid, Gabriel Landeskog, Sidney Crosby and Vincent Lecavalier being the others) in NHL history.
 One of only eight players to win Olympic gold and the Stanley Cup in the same year.
 2013 Frank J. Selke Trophy winner
 2013 NHL second All-Star team
 2014 Winter Olympics — Gold Medalist
 2015 Mark Messier Leadership Award winner
 2015 ESPY Best NHL Player
 2016 World Cup of Hockey gold medal
Named on 100 Greatest NHL Players list for NHL's Centennial Anniversary
 NHL 11 cover athlete
 NHL 16 cover athlete

References

External links

 

1988 births
Living people
AHCA Division I men's ice hockey All-Americans
Canadian expatriate ice hockey players in the United States
Canadian ice hockey centres
Canadian Mennonites
Canadian people of French descent 
Canadian philanthropists
Chicago Blackhawks captains
Chicago Blackhawks draft picks
Chicago Blackhawks players
Conn Smythe Trophy winners
Franco-Manitoban people
Frank Selke Trophy winners
Ice hockey people from Winnipeg
Ice hockey players at the 2010 Winter Olympics
Ice hockey players at the 2014 Winter Olympics
Medalists at the 2010 Winter Olympics
Medalists at the 2014 Winter Olympics
Members of the Order of Manitoba
National Hockey League All-Stars
National Hockey League first-round draft picks
North Dakota Fighting Hawks men's ice hockey players
Olympic gold medalists for Canada
Olympic ice hockey players of Canada
Olympic medalists in ice hockey
Stanley Cup champions
Triple Gold Club